Komal Meer is a Pakistani television actress. She is best known for portraying the supporting character of Rameen in Momina Duraid and ISPR's Ehd-e-Wafa. Her other appearances include Resham Gali Ki Husna, Benaam, Badshah Begum and Qalandar.

Filmography

References 

21st-century Pakistani actresses
Living people
Year of birth missing (living people)
Place of birth missing (living people)